Kalanaur Assembly constituency is one of the 90 Legislative Assembly constituencies of Haryana state in India.

It is part of Rohtak district and is reserved for candidates belonging to the Scheduled Castes.

Members of the Legislative Assembly

Election results

2019

See also
 List of constituencies of the Haryana Legislative Assembly
 Rohtak district

References

Rohtak district
Assembly constituencies of Haryana